Pleckstrin homology domain-containing family O member 1 is a protein that in humans is encoded by the PLEKHO1 gene.

Interactions 

PLEKHO1 has been shown to interact with Casein kinase 2, alpha 1 and SMURF1.

References

Further reading